A horse fair is a (typically annual) fair where people buy and sell horses.

In the United Kingdom there are many fairs which are traditionally attended by Romani people and travellers who converge at the fairs to buy and sell horses, meet with friends and relations and to celebrate their music, history and folklore.

Many horse fairs are centuries old, dating back to the 16th century, such as the Appleby Horse Fair and The Great October Fair at Ballinasloe.

List of important horse fairs in the United Kingdom
Appleby Horse Fair, Appleby-in-Westmorland, Cumbria
Ballyclare May Fair, Ballyclare, County Antrim
Barnet Fair, Barnet, London
Brigg Fair, Brigg, Lincolnshire
Dartmoor Drift, Dartmoor, Devon
Horncastle Horse Fair, Lincolnshire
Lee Gap, Yorkshire
Stow Fair, Stow-on-the-Wold, Gloucestershire
Wickham Horse Fair, Wickham, Hampshire
Widecombe Fair, Widecombe-in-the-Moor, Devon

Gallery

See also
 Stow Fair, Lincolnshire, lost medieval fair which continued as a horse fair until 1954
 Banagher Horse Fair, in Banagher, County Offaly, Republic of Ireland
 Ballinasloe Horse Fair
Fairs

References